Bae Sung-woong, better known as Bengi, is a South Korean former professional League of Legends player, and current head coach for T1.

Bae is one of the only two players to have won three League of Legends World Championships, having done so in 2013, 2015, and 2016. He has also won the All-Star Paris 2014. He owns three different League of Legends skins as a result of winning World Championships, which include SKT T1 Lee Sin (2013), SKT T1 Elise (2015) and SKT T1 Olaf (2016).

He had played a total number of 319 matches in his career, with 231 wins and 88 losses, and a win rate of 72.4%.

Early life 
Bae was born in South Korea on November 21, 1993.

Bae enlisted in the army on January 28, 2019. He was discharged on September 4, 2020.

Career 
Bae was previously known as JangTa. He started his career with BBT before joining SK Telecom T1 2 in 2013.

On November 27, 2017, he returned as a coach for SK Telecom T1. He parted ways with the team in November 2018.

On November 13, 2020, he rejoined T1 as the head coach for T1 Challengers team.

On December 3, 2021, Bae was promoted as a coach from T1 Challengers to T1's main roster, which competes in LCK's main stage.

On September 5, 2022, Bae was assigned as the interim head coach of T1.

References 

South Korean esports players
T1 (esports) players
Living people
League of Legends jungle players
Year of birth missing (living people)
League of Legends coaches